Krzysztof Maciejewski (born 22 August 1964) is a retired Polish football defender.

References

1964 births
Living people
Polish footballers
GKS Katowice players
Polonia Bytom players
Association football defenders
Poland international footballers